Wong Chun Hin (9 July 1995 – 6 June 2022) was a Hong Kong professional footballer who played as a midfielder.

Honours
Hong Kong
 Hong Kong–Macau Interport: 2014

References

External links

Wong Chun Hin at HKFA

1995 births
2022 deaths
2022 suicides
Suicides by jumping in Hong Kong
Hong Kong footballers
Hong Kong First Division League players
Hong Kong Premier League players
Association football midfielders
Eastern Sports Club footballers
Sun Hei SC players
Hong Kong Rangers FC players
Lee Man FC players